Malerkotla Assembly constituency (Sl. No.: 105) is a Punjab Legislative Assembly constituency in Sangrur district, Punjab state, India.

Members of the Legislative Assembly

Election results

2022

2017

See also
 List of constituencies of the Punjab Legislative Assembly
 Sangrur district

References

External links
  

Assembly constituencies of Punjab, India
Sangrur district